Mike James Kirkland (born 1949 in Yazoo City, Mississippi) is an American R&B singer. He began his recording career in 1965, as leader of Mike & The Censations, a quartet which included his brother Robert, their sister and her husband. He was also half of the duo Bo and Ruth on Claridge Records who achieved a U.K. Top 20 single with their release of "You're Gonna Get Next To Me" (credited to Bo Kirkland and Ruth Davis) in the summer of 1977.

Biography 
Mike James Kirkland grew up singing gospel and doo wop in Mississippi in a local gospel act, The Seven Seals, with his two brothers, Walter and Robert. He began his recording career as leader of the group Mike & The Censations in 1965. After the Censations folded, Kirkland and his brother Robert moved to California where they started a record label, Bryan Records, so they could release love songs and soul music that Kirkland was working on. They released two albums, Hang on in There (1972) and Doin' it Right (1973), following the style and social comment of artists like Marvin Gaye and Curtis Mayfield. In 1975, Kirland began issuing solo recordings under the name Bo Kirkand. Also a Bo, he recorded an album as a part of duo with Ruth Davis.

The reputation of the albums slowly grew and spread over the following years, culminating with reissues in the '90s by Luv N Haight.

In 2010, John Legend & The Roots released an album that includes a cover of one of Kirkland's songs, "Hang On In There."

Discography
Albums:
Hang on in There 1972, reissued 1999
Doin' it Right 1973, reissued 1999

Singles:
 "Victim of Circumstance", Mike & the Censations  1965 - Top 50 R&B
 "There is Nothing I Can Do About It", Mike & the Censations - Top 50 R&B
 "Together" / "The Prophet", Mike James Kirkland 1971

References

1949 births
Living people
American rhythm and blues singers
Revue Records artists